A cockatrice is a legendary creature resembling a large rooster with a lizard-like tail.

Cockatrice may also refer to:

 Cockatrice (Dungeons & Dragons), a small avian magical beast in the role-playing game Dungeons & Dragons
 HMS Cockatrice, eight ships of the Royal Navy
 Cockatrice, a British armoured vehicle mounting a Lagonda flamethrower 
 Cockatrice, open-source freeware used to play card games such as Magic: The Gathering over a network

See also
 Coquatrix, a French surname variant